Mr. Sun is the tenth studio album by American country music group Little Big Town. It was released on September 16, 2022, through Capitol Nashville and is a follow-up to their 2020 release Nightfall. It was self-produced by the band and features the single "Hell Yeah".

Background
The band announced the album in July 2022. Most of album was written during the COVID-19 pandemic. During the pandemic, it was the first time in twenty years that the band did not tour. It was during this time that they found the inspiration to write for this album.

Jimi Westbrook wrote "Rich Man," which he describes as the "most heartfelt, personal, and special" song he's ever written.

Critical reception

Stephen Thomas Erlewine of All Music wrote that the album "is filled with sweetness, hope, and light, a record built for comfort, not speed. Consider the overwhelming sweetness as the band's way of processing the upheaval generated by the COVID-19 pandemic. I stead of wallowing in sorrow, they bask in the sunshine; even the slower ballads act as a balm, serving up smoothing melodies instead of sadness."

Catherine Walthall of American Songwriter praised the album saying, "Mr. Sun is a bright, upbeat album heavily inspired by the groovy music from the '70s. It's an album perfectly suited for yacht rock hang-outs or rollerblading meet-ups. Inside the record, notes reminiscent of the Bee Gees, Fleetwood Mac, and the Eagles ring out, but they're all tailored to Little Big Town's country expertise. Songs like "Gold" and "Heaven Had A Dance Floor" posses a particularly disco-definite sound."

Nicole Piering for Country Swag calls "Little Big Town at its absolute best" with Mr. Sun.

Zackary Kephart of The Musical Divide had mixed reviews for the album. He felt that the album was an "oddly disjointed attempt at both expanding the more mature sonic and lyrical foundation they set on their previous albums and throwing a few slick, ultra-polished cuts in along the way for good measure." Though he did say that "there's also a richness present in a lot of the organic warmth that can still feel unique to this band's core, especially when it can match writing that's only grown more mature and nuanced with each passing album."

Promotion
On September 14, 2022, Little Big Town appeared on The Tonight Show Starring Jimmy Fallon, and performed "Hell Yeah" and "Rich Man". They also appeared on The Today Show on September 16, 2022.

Singles
"Hell Yeah", the lead single was released on April 11, 2022.

Track listing

Personnel
Little Big Town
 Karen Fairchild – lead vocals (tracks 1, 2, 5, 6, 8, 13–15), tambourine (13), production (all tracks), art direction
 Kimberly Schlapman – lead vocals (7, 15), production (all tracks)
 Philip Sweet – lead vocals (3, 11, 15, 16), keyboards (11), 12-string acoustic guitar (12), acoustic guitar (15), production (all tracks)
 Jimi Westbrook – lead vocals (4, 9, 10, 12, 15), production (all tracks)

Additional musicians
 Tim Galloway – acoustic guitar (1–10, 12, 14), electric guitar (1, 2, 5–10, 12–16), percussion (5), mandolin (8, 15), banjo (15)
 John Thomasson – bass
 Hubert Payne – drums (all tracks), percussion (1–5, 7–16)
 Akil Thompson – electric guitar (1, 3, 4, 8, 11–13, 16), keyboards (1–7, 10–16), Hammond B3 (2–4, 6, 10, 12, 13, 16), acoustic guitar (7, 12, 16), percussion (11, 16)
 Evan Weatherford – electric guitar (1, 3–8, 10–16), acoustic guitar (11)
 Alysa Vanderheym – percussion, synthesizer (1)
 Josh Reynolds – programming (1, 14)
 Daniel Tashian – electric guitar (7)
 Luke Dick – clavichord, percussion (8)
 Jedd Hughes – electric guitar (11)
 Todd Clark – electric guitar, keyboards, percussion (13)

Technical
 Emily Lazar – mastering
 Chris Allgood – mastering
 Rob Kinelski – mixing, engineering
 Alysa Vanderheym – additional production (1)
 Luke Dick – additional production (8)
 Todd Clark – additional production, recording (13)
 Josh Reynolds – recording (all tracks), vocal engineering (1, 5, 6, 9, 11, 13)
 Jason Hall – editing (12)
 Casey Cuayo – engineering assistance
 Eli Heisler – engineering assistance
 Zaq Reynolds – engineering assistance (1, 3, 4, 6, 7, 10–12, 15, 16)
 Joe Trentacosti – engineering assistance (2, 4, 5, 8, 9, 13, 14)
 Nico Salgado – engineering assistance (9)
 Jacob Butler – engineering assistance (13, 16)

Design
 Mary Hooper – art direction, design
 Ashley Kohorst – art direction, design
 Kelly Jarrell – art direction
 Kera Jackson – art production
 Blair Getz Mezibov – photography

Charts

References

2022 albums
Capitol Records albums
Little Big Town albums